Dave Carr may refer to:

Dave Carr (footballer, born 1937) (1937–2013), English footballer who played for Darlington, Workington and Watford in the 1950s and 1960s
Dave Carr (footballer, born 1957) (1957–2005), English footballer who played for Luton, Lincoln and Torquay in the 1970s and 1980s
Dave Carr (footballer, born 1982), Antigua and Barbuda international footballer

See also
David Carr (disambiguation)